The West Lancashire Light Railway (WLLR) is a  narrow gauge railway that operates at Hesketh Bank, situated between Preston and Southport in North West England. The railway has seven steam locomotives, three of which are in operating condition; two are currently being rebuilt and another is on static display. There are also two electric locomotives and many IC locomotives.

History 

The West Lancashire Light Railway was started in 1967, by six railway enthusiast schoolboys from the Hesketh Bank area. They wanted to save the narrow gauge railway equipment which was disappearing from local industries. They leased a strip of land above the clay pits at Alty's Brickworks and started laying track using rails from the former clay tramways and rough timbers as sleepers.

Two Ruston and Hornsby diesel locomotives were acquired from Burscough Brick & Tile Co. one with a 13 hp engine, the other a 20 hp model, they were respectively named Clwyd and Tawd. Clwyd was the first locomotive to run on the railway in 1969. These two locos were soon joined by more industrial diesels and the first home-built items of rolling stock.

At first, trains were operated on a "travel at your own risk" basis. The first formal timetable was issued in 1971.

In 1970, the railway acquired an incomplete set of parts of 1903 Quarry Hunslet steam locomotive Irish Mail, from Dinorwic slate quarry in North Wales. The major missing component was a boiler. Members of the WLLR retrieved the remains of Quarry Hunslet Alice from one of the upper levels of Dinorwic. Alice's boiler was retained at the WLLR and the rest sold to the Bala Lake Railway. Over the next decade the railway re-assembled Irish Mail and the locomotive was steamed for the first time in 1980.

The running line slowly grew in length until it ran from Becconsall to a station known as Asland, which is no longer the far terminus of the line. The line in its present form runs from Becconsall to Delph, with the original track to Asland running on from Delph but not suitable for running engines.

In 2015, the WLLR hosted a gala to celebrate the 100th. anniversary of its Joffre class Kerr Stuart locomotive. A second Joffre class locomotive, No. 3014, attended from Apedale Valley Light Railway. This was the first time that two WWI-era Joffre locomotives had been in steam together in preservation.

Facilities 

The railway's sheds and workshops are situated at Becconsall station. The first shed was built by the members using cast-off bricks from Alty's. This original workshop has been much added to over the years and the equipment in this workshop allows most of the work on restoring a steam locomotive to be undertaken, excluding boiler construction. Facilities for visitors have also been built at Becconsall.

Operations

The WLLR is open to the public on Sundays and Bank Holidays from Easter to the end of October, also on some other days during school holidays. Passengers can ride in semi-open coaches which have been built by the railway's volunteers. Gala weekends are also organised, when visiting steam locomotives can be seen in operation. Other events include Easter Egg Hunt, Teddy Bears' Day, Friendly Engines Day, Strawberries and Steam, Halloween, Princess and Pirates Day, Pumpkin Express, Volunteers Day, Children in Need, and Santa Specials.

'Drive an Engine' days can be arranged for individuals or small groups to learn how to operate a steam engine. Bookings can also be taken for birthday parties (and other types of celebration) and for visits by schools, colleges, clubs and societies.

Rolling stock

Steam locomotives

Internal combustion locomotives

Electric Locomotives

Wagons 
The WLLR and its members own a variety of goods wagons obtained from several UK industrial narrow gauge railways, including tipper sand wagons from Pilkington Brothers sandfields in the Rainford and Bickerstaffe areas.

See also 

 British narrow gauge railways
 Lakeside Miniature Railway, Southport
 Moseley Railway Trust

References

External links 
The West Lancashire Light Railway homepage
Video report in Southport Reporter from August 2007
Audio report in Southport Reporter
West Lancashire Light Railway - Visit Lancashire
Photos of many of the WLLR locomotives

Heritage railways in Lancashire
2 ft gauge railways in England
Borough of West Lancashire